The Party of Estonian Christian Democrats (Erakond Eesti Kristlikud Demokraadid), formerly known as the Estonian Christian People's Party (Eesti Kristlik Rahvapartei) was a political party in Estonia, which is not represented in the Riigikogu (parliament). In 2012, the party was declared bankrupt by a court, therefore it cannot participate in elections.

It is a Christian-conservative party which is opposed to the European Constitution and campaigned against Estonia joining the EU. The party is a member of the European Christian Political Movement (EPCM).

Party in elections
At the 2003 legislative elections, the party won 1.1% of the popular vote (5,275 votes) and no seats. In the 2007 parliamentary election, this improved to 9,443 (1.7%), but still fell far short of the 5% threshold.

In the 2002 local council elections, the EKRP was elected in 3 local councils out of 247 and collected 7 seats.
In Kuressaare it collected 1 seat out of 21 (5.6% share of votes; 294 votes), in Pihtla Parish 2 seats out of 11 (24.7% share of votes; 163 votes) and in Püssi 4 seats out of 13 (31.8% share of votes; 191 votes).

In the 2005 local council elections the EKRP took part in 13 local elections out of 227 and collected 3 seats. In the whole country, the party collected 1799 votes which made up 0.36% of all votes. The Party won a seat in Kuressaare (1 seat out of 21; 5.4% share of votes; 264 votes) and Pihtla Parish (2 seats out of 11; 18.3% share of votes; 109 votes)

The party took part, but didn't collect any seats in these councils:
Keila (1.6% share of votes; 57 votes)
Ridala Parish (3.0% share of votes; 30 votes)
Haljala Parish (2.0% share of votes; 18 votes)
Vihula Parish (3.0% share of votes; 27 votes)
Kaarma Parish (2.1% share of votes; 26 votes)
Valjala Parish (8.7%; 45 votes)
Puka Parish (1.8% share of votes; 10 votes)
Viljandi (0.6% share of votes; 41 votes)
Võru (3.9% share of votes; 235 votes)
Tallinn (0.7% share of vote; 891 votes)
Tartu (0.1% share of vote; 46 votes).
In the town of Püssi the party didn't take part in the elections and lost its four seats. In local elections in Estonia the threshold is 5% of valid votes cast in the council.

External links
Official website
Site of the European Christian Political Movement

1998 establishments in Estonia
Christian democratic parties in Europe
Conservative parties in Estonia
Eurosceptic parties in Estonia
Political parties established in 2003
Political parties in Estonia
Protestant political parties
Defunct political parties in Estonia